Kidman Park is a western suburb of Adelaide, South Australia. It is located in the City of Charles Sturt.

History
Once owned by the eponymous pastoralist, Sidney Kidman, Kidman Park was established in 1954 by the South Australian Housing Trust.

Geography
Kidman Park lies between Grange Road and the River Torrens. Findon Road forms the suburb's eastern boundary.

Demographics

The 2016 Census by the Australian Bureau of Statistics counted 3,380 persons in Kidman Park on census night. Of these, 48.8% were male and 51.2% were female.

The majority of residents (21.1%) are of Italian background, with other common census responses being Australian (17.6%), Greece (7.9%) and England (19.2%).

The age distribution of Kidman Park residents is skewed higher than the greater Australian population. 75.4% of residents were over 25 years in 2016, compared to the Australian average of 68.8%; and 24.6% were younger than 25 years, compared to the Australian average of 31.2%.

Politics

Local government
Kidman Park is part of Findon Ward in the City of Charles Sturt local government area, being represented in that council by Doriana Coppola and Joe Ienco.

State and federal
Kidman Park lies in the state electoral district of Colton and the federal electoral division of Hindmarsh. The suburb is represented in the South Australian House of Assembly by Paul Caica and federally by Matt Williams.

Community

Schools
Kidman Park Primary School is located on Dean Avenue. It was founded in 1967.

Facilities and attractions

Parks
Collins Reserve is located on Valetta Road. Linear Park extends along the River Torrens on the suburbs southern boundary.

The Fulham Cricket Club has its home at Collins Reserve. It is a cricket club in the western suburbs of Adelaide. The Club fields several senior and junior teams with the red, white and black colours and Falcon emblem.

Transportation

Roads
Kidman Park is serviced by Findon Road and Grange Road, the latter connecting the suburb to Adelaide city centre.

Public transport
Kidman Park is serviced by public transport run by the Adelaide Metro. buses run on findon road, grange road, valetta road and tapleys hill road.

Bicycle routes
A combined pedestrian and bicycle path lies along Linear Park, Collins Reserve and the Torrens River.

See also

 List of Adelaide suburbs

References

External links

Suburbs of Adelaide
Populated places established in 1954